Ypacaraí is a town in the Central Department of Paraguay on the Lake Ypacarai. On the Paraguayan highway system, it is located between Asunción and Caacupé, near Areguá and San Bernardino. Known as the "City of Folklore" after the Ypacaraí Festival, it is located on the Ybytypanemá mountain range, which is in the Los Altos mountain range, near the Ypacaraí lake. In 2020, the village had a population of 28,283, and is 64.1 m above sea level. Notable agricultural crops of the area include tobacco and cotton. Lake Ypacaraí is popular with tourists and locals in the landlocked nation of Paraguay.

Paraguayan footballer Carlos Gamarra is from Ypacaraí.

Etymology
Ypacaraí, means "Conjured Lake", so called because in 1603, the missionary Luis de Bolaños blessed the lake to contain its waters, since they flooded all the way to the Valley of Pirayú. The Guarani words, "ypa" means lake and "karai" means Lord or blessed, thus Paraguay has the Lord's Lake or Blessed Lake.

There are other versions, such as the one that says that when the Spaniards arrived they asked the natives what the lake was called and, responding, they said "Ypa Karaí?" Which when translated is "Are you referring to the water, Sir?".

History
The city that already existed at the end of the 17th century – was one of the Itauguá companies, with the name of «Guazú Virá», later changed to «Tacuaral».

On 27 March 1864, the extension of the railway line to the Guazú Virá station was inaugurated, called "Estación Tacuaral" (from there it takes the name of "Tacuaral"), around said station the community grew due to the movement that this generated. Over the years the idea of separating from Itauguá arose and a commission was formed to take the request to the President of the Paraguayan Republic, General Patricio Escobar. This commission was made up of: Lytton Snead, José Galo Guanes, Higinio Escobar, Eustaquio Feliú, David Baruch, Ramón Negrete, Dionisio Pérez and Eliseo Patiño, thus initiating the corresponding procedures.

On 13 September of the year 1887 the creation of "Ypacaraí" was established. The first people to lead the town were Mr. Higinio Escobar as police chief and justice of the peace and Father Adolfo Valenzuela, in charge of religious services.
The district was very marginalized during the Stroessner dictatorship, which is why it came to be known as "the capital of folklore and democracy".

Geography
Ypacaraí limits to the west with the departmental capital Areguá, to the south with Itá, to the north with Ypacaraí Lake and to the east with the department of Cordillera . Belonging to the central part and the metropolitan region of the Greater Asunción Area.

Hydrography
Several streams flow into the lake and they are: Pirayú, Paso Puente, Estrella, Jukury, in turn the waters of the lake flow into the Paraguay River, through the Salado River .
 
The Ypacaraí Lake has been an inspiration for locals and others, and as a result of this the song known worldwide as "Memories of Ypacaraí" was born, composed by Zulema de Mirkin and Demetrio Ortiz . This lake has an extension of 22 km from north to south, between 5 and 6 km wide and a depth of 3m, surrounded by lush vegetation.

Climate
The maximum temperature in the summer, reaches 40 °C, which can rise even more in some occasions. The minimum temperature for winter is −2 °C. The annual average is 22 °C.
The rains oscillate in approximately 1433 mm annually. The season with the highest rainfall is between the months of January and April, the rarest being between the months of June to August.

Economy
The main activity is the manufacture of guitars and handicrafts in saddlery, and everything related to leather, blankets, bedspreads and hammocks. There are also several chipa home-made factories.

It has a rich agricultural and industrial activity. Of the latter, the majority is found in Ypacaraí, such as cotton gins, textile and logging industries, and vegetable oil refineries. The already famous Ypacaraí Lake festival, known worldwide, is another economic entry to the city and the expo fair held every year in the historic center of the city.

Culture
In this city we can visit the monument to music, symbol and trophy of the Ypacaraí Festival. Upon entering the city, we come across the Sacred Heart of Jesus Church, also the "House of Culture: Teodoro S. Mongelós", in which there is a mausoleum, the mortal remains of Teodoro S. Mongelós and Demetrio Ortiz, creator of "Memories of Ypacaraí", also in this Cultural Center is the Museum "Memoria Ypacaraiense" where objects from the war of 70 are exhibited, and also of contemporary people, illustrious men and women.

Francisco Gaona, educator, social activist, trade unionist and historian, author of the book called "Introduction to the Guild and Social History of Paraguay", was born in this city in 1901.

It is worth highlighting the history of Luisón de Tacuaral, a legend that originated in Cerrito, a place adjacent to the city.

The Paraguayan rock bands of Salamandra and Bohemia Urbana, of great national and international diffusion, are originally from this city, where they also usually record takes for their video clips.

The public square; considered as the main axis of the cultural and historical heritage of the city, it is connected to the Station and the House of Culture.

Religion 
The Sacred Heart of Jesus parish is the main church of the city along with the convent of the house of the Franciscan sisters and the
Shrine of the Virgin of Schoenstatt of Tuparendá; replica of the sanctuary of the one in Germany, with an infrastructure to house several groups, it has a beautiful vegetation, a major construction is currently being carried out. We also find the Salesian Church of Don Bosco; There is also the house of the "Salesian Family".

Sports
On the occasion of the National Bicentennial of the Republic of Paraguay, the government inaugurated in 2010 the National Bicentennial Stadium of Ypacaraí.

Carlos Gamarra, born in the city in 1971, was captain of the Paraguayan team and played the World Cups in France 1998, Korea-Japan 2002 and Germany 2006. He was one of the most prominent Paraguayan defenders worldwide, integrating teams of clubs such as Independiente de Avellaneda, Benfica, AEK Athens F.C., Atlético de Madrid, Internazionale and the two most traditional shirts of Paraguayan football, Cerro Porteño (where he made his professional debut) and Club Olimpia where he finished his career. He was captain of the soccer team that won the only Paraguayan sports Olympic medal in Athens 2004.

Sister cities

Ypacaraí is twinned with:

Santa Fe, Argentina (1978)
San Gregorio de Polanco, Uruguay

Gallery

References

Populated places in the Central Department
Guaraní words and phrases